Stacey Ross (born 21 October 1973 in London) is an English former professional squash player. He won his first professional tournament in May 2005 and reached a career-high world ranking of 39 in June 2007. He competed multiple times in the British Open. He is currently director of squash at the Wimbledon Club.

References

1973 births
Living people
English male squash players